Midsomer Murders is a British crime drama television series, adapted by Anthony Horowitz and Douglas Watkinson from the novels in the Chief Inspector Barnaby book series (created by Caroline Graham), and broadcast on two channels of ITV since its premiere on 23 March 1997. The series focuses on various murder cases that take place within small country villages across the fictional English county of Midsomer, and the efforts of the senior police detective and his partner within the fictional Midsomer Constabulary to solve the crime by determining who the culprit is and the motive for their actions. It identifies itself differently from other detective dramas often by featuring a mixture of lighthearted whimsy and dark humour, as well as a notable soundtrack that includes the use of the theremin instrument for the show's theme tune.

The programme has featured two lead stars—from its premiere in 1997, John Nettles as Detective Chief Inspector (DCI) Tom Barnaby, until his retirement from the drama in February 2011; then Neil Dudgeon as DCI John Barnaby, Tom's younger cousin, since March 2011. Both main stars have featured a list of supporting actors who worked alongside them, including Jane Wymark, Barry Jackson, Daniel Casey, John Hopkins, Jason Hughes, and Gwilym Lee, with Nick Hendrix as the current co-star working with Dudgeon. Midsomer Murders remains a popular feature in British television schedules and has been broadcast internationally in over 200 countries and territories.

Summary
Midsomer Murders is a detective drama set in modern-day England. The stories revolve around the efforts of Detective Chief Inspector Tom Barnaby, and later his successor, cousin John Barnaby, to solve numerous murders that take place in the picturesque but deadly villages of the fictional county of Midsomer. The Barnabys have worked with several different sergeants throughout the run of the show: Detective Sergeant (DS) Gavin Troy (Daniel Casey), DS Dan Scott (John Hopkins), DS Ben Jones (Jason Hughes), DS Charlie Nelson (Gwilym Lee) and DS Jamie Winter (Nick Hendrix).

Production
Filming of Midsomer Murders began in autumn 1996, and the first episode, "The Killings at Badger's Drift", was broadcast in the United Kingdom on 23 March 1997. This inaugural episode was the highest-rated single drama programme of 1997, watched by 13.5 million viewers. Throughout its run, the feature-length drama has attracted many well-known accomplished actors from the stage and screen in guest-starring roles.

Anthony Horowitz and the original producers, Betty Willingale and Brian True-May, created the series. Horowitz adapted the majority of the early episodes from the original works by Caroline Graham. Current writers include Helen Jenkins, Jeff Povey, Nicholas Hicks-Beach, Julia Gilbert and Chris Murray.

Actor John Nettles originated the role of Detective Chief Inspector Tom Barnaby. Nettles' character retired at the end of 2010, after the 13th series of eight episodes; his last episode was "Fit for Murder". Neil Dudgeon replaced him in the 14th series, playing Tom Barnaby's cousin, DCI John Barnaby, who was first seen in a series 13 episode, "The Sword of Guillaume". Dudgeon made his first appearance in Midsomer Murders in the series 4 episode "Garden of Death", in which he played the role of a tongue-in-cheek gardener, Daniel Bolt, rather interested in sex.

Series 20 began in the UK on ITV on 10 March 2019, with episode 1, "The Ghosts of Causton Abbey". In the US, the entire six-episode series was immediately released on the streaming services Acorn TV and BritBox, and became available on Netflix after the UK broadcast schedule had finished. The show was removed from Netflix in October 2019; only the first 19 series had been shown on the service. Series 20 onward have never been shown on Netflix in US or Canada. As of January, 2021, series 1–20 can be seen in the US on IMDb TV and Tubi TV.

The show's official social media confirmed that production of series 21 began in March 2019. As with series 20, series 21 is to be initially released in the USA. It is to premiere on Acorn TV and BritBox on 1 December 2019, before airing in the UK in January 2020.

As of October 2020, filming had begun on series 22 after being delayed by the COVID-19 pandemic.

Setting
Midsomer is a fictional English county. The county town is Causton, a medium-sized town where Detective Chief Inspector Barnaby lives with his wife and where the Criminal Investigation Department (CID) is located. Much of the popularity of the series arises from the incongruity of sudden violence in a picturesque and peaceful rural setting. Various clues in several episodes hint that Midsomer might actually cover the areas of Berkshire and part of northern Hampshire. This may be supported by the episode "Dead in the Water" where a body is found in the River Thames.

Many of the villages and small towns of the county have the word "Midsomer" in their name; this is inspired in part by the real county of Somerset, and specifically, its actual town of Midsomer Norton, and became a naming convention within the show. Midsomer Wellow and Causton are derived from the names of real Somerset villages Wellow and Corston.

Each episode usually contains several murders, the high body count being a well-known feature of the show. Despite this, the culprit is almost never a serial killer—very frequently the murderer is driven by circumstance to compound his or her crimes, and keeps killing to cover up the original murder.

Humour is a main feature of the series. There is often dark comedy, such as a woman being murdered with a wheel of cheese, and many scenes are examples of "dramedy" (comic drama or dramatic comedy). According to Radio Times when describing the episode "Death and the Divas" (series 15, episode 4): "Midsomer Murders never takes itself too seriously but here it's got its tongue so far into its cheek, it hurts."

Nostalgia has also been a feature of the show, especially in its Nettles era. Most episodes have been set in hermetic rural villages of a kind that were already changing rapidly by the time the series began, Nettles opined in a 2003 interview. The old-fashioned settings are true to the Graham novels: "Although the books are set in the present", wrote one reviewer, Graham's country villages "seem to come from another time". "The spirit is obviously of the '50s", Nettles remarked, and the less crowded, less complicated village/world was clearly part of the books' appeal.

In recent years, Midsomer County has become extremely diverse and it not unusual to find a high percentage of multiple ethnic minorities living in one village. Series 22 featured villages that, along with Caucasians, one village might be home to South Asians, East Asians, Southeast Asians, Afro-Caribbeans, as well as others of mixed heritage.

Filming locations
Causton is represented by a number of towns including Thame and Wallingford, in Oxfordshire.

The Six Bells, a pub in Warborough, Oxfordshire, repeatedly features as the Black Swan in the Midsomer village of Badger's Drift. The Bull & Butcher, the village pub in Turville, Buckinghamshire, featured in both "Murder on St. Malley's Day" (renamed as The Chalk and Gown) and in "Schooled in Murder" (renamed as The Spotted Cow).

Filming took place on Sunday 11 August 2013 at White Waltham Airfield, southwest of Maidenhead, for episode 4 of Series 16, "The Flying Club".

The Buckinghamshire tourism authority announced in 2021 the launching of three themed tours of locations in the county that have been used to film the series.

In "The Killings of Copenhagen"—number five in the sixteenth series and the 100th episode overall—several scenes are filmed on location in central Copenhagen, like Rådhuspladsen ("the City Hall Square"), Nyhavn ("New Port") with its canal and old colourful houses, a Danish countryside church, and at the circular courtyard inside the Copenhagen Police Headquarters building. The murder in Copenhagen is one of three within the entire series (until episode 114, at least) that take place outside the fictional County of Midsomer, the others being in Wales where DCI Tom Barnaby (John Nettles) and DS Ben Jones (Jason Hughes) travel in ‘Death and Dust’ and Brighton where Inspector John Barnaby (Neil Dudgeon) is introduced.

Characters

Episodes

The pilot episode of Midsomer Murders was shown on 23 March 1997. As of the end of 2021, 132 episodes have been broadcast in the UK, comprising 22 series.

20th Anniversary Special 
In June 2019, US streaming service Acorn TV began streaming a 20th Anniversary Special presented by John Nettles. The one-hour documentary brings together former and current actors on the show as well as producers and others working behind the scene to discuss memorable moments from the past 20 series and the peculiar quirks that have made the show a success.

25th Anniversary Documentary
In May 2022, ITV announced that there would be a documentary celebrating the show's 25th anniversary.

Entitled Midsomer Murders – 25 Years of Mayhem and due to air later in the year, it will feature contributions from cast members including John Nettles, Neil Dudgeon, Jane Wymark, Fiona Dolman, Daniel Casey, Jason Hughes and Annette Badland, as well as writer Jeff Povey and producer Ian Strachan. It will also delve behind the scenes of filming series 23 and highlight pre-fame appearances by actors such as Orlando Bloom and Henry Cavill.

ITV subsequently announced that the one-hour documentary would air on the channel on Sunday 29 May 2022 at 7pm.

Controversy
In March 2011, the series' producer, Brian True-May, was suspended by All3Media after telling the TV listings magazine Radio Times that the programme did not have any non-white characters because the series was "the last bastion of Englishness and I want to keep it that way". When challenged about the term "Englishness" and whether that would exclude ethnic minorities, True-May responded: "Well, it should do, and maybe I'm not politically correct." He later went on to say that he wanted to make a programme "that appeals to a certain audience, which seems to succeed." True-May's comments were investigated by the production company. He was reinstated, having apologised "if his remarks gave unintended offence to any viewers", but subsequently stepped down as producer. ITV said it was "shocked and appalled" at True-May's comments, which were "absolutely not shared by anyone at ITV".

True-May's replacement, Jo Wright, confirmed that she was committed to on-screen diversity when she took over the helm of the show, saying: "I feel strongly that a range of ethnic groups should be represented on screen. And that will be reflected in some of the episodes in the new series with key guest casting. I will cast the series in the same way as I always do, by starting with the best script. And a good script will include a variety of different characters." In series 15, Asian actors played central characters in the show for the first time, in the episode "Written in the Stars". Black characters also began to appear starting in that series. Beginning with series 18, the show gained an Asian member for its main cast: pathologist Kam Karimore, played by Manjinder Virk. She left the show at the end of series 19.

Broadcast
In 2004, Midsomer Murders was among the three most-sold British TV shows worldwide, whether as TV programming or DVD. , Midsomer Murders had been sold to more than 200 countries around the world.

In Australia, first-run episodes and repeats are screened on national free-to-air network ABC with repeats also shown on the Nine Network channel, 9Gem. The series was originally only aired on the Nine Network. Repeat screenings are also aired on the subscription channels UKTV and 13th Street. A measure of the success of the series in Australia is that repeats of the series still rate highly and often feature in the nation's top twenty shows in national surveys.

In Canada, the series is broadcast on TVOntario and Book Television in Ontario, on Knowledge in British Columbia, and via American PBS channels available throughout southern parts of Canada. , the first thirteen series are currently available in Canada on Amazon Prime Video, while only series 21 is available on Britbox. The first nineteen series are also available on streaming service/app Tubi and Acorn.

In Ireland, the series is aired on Virgin Media Three every Monday night at 8pm. It is one of the channel's highest-rated shows.

In New Zealand, the series was broadcast on TVNZ 1 and it was broadcast for a number of years on the free-to-air channel Prime.

In the United States, the series was first aired by A&E, which broadcast "The Killings at Badger's Drift" on 28 June 1998 and followed with the next four episodes over the 1998–99 series. The show remained on A&E for many years until it was syndicated by American Public Television for broadcast on public television stations. , episodes through series 21 are available on the streaming service Acorn TV, with episodes of the current series 22 appearing as they are made available.

As of February, 2023, Midsomer Murders is broadcast in the USA on the Ion Mystery Network.

As of March 2023, Midsomer Murders is broadcast in the USA on the streaming service Pluto TV, with a channel dedicated entirely to the series.

Soundtracks
Composed by Jim Parker, the main theme is a moderate-tempo waltz, performed (primarily though not exclusively) on an unusual electronic musical instrument, the theremin, which has a sound not unlike a low whistle or a human voice. The theremin part was played by Celia Sheen (1940–2011). From the 14th series onwards the soundtrack was altered so that during the closing titles a standardised version of the theme is played on a solo violin in place of the theremin. Occasionally a version with a longer introduction opens the show, using a flute rather than a theremin as the lead instrument.

The closing theme for ‘The Scarecrow Murders’, shown on 29 May 2022 to celebrate 25 years, was a more jovial clarinet version.

Multiple soundtrack CDs have been released so far, containing versions of the theme and musical cues from various series.

Home media
All 114 episodes that have aired so far have been released in the UK (Region 2) including three Christmas specials. The first 18 series and "Part 1" of series 19 of Midsomer Murders have been released in Australia and New Zealand (Region 4). Note that episodes 1 to 100 were originally released as 25 "sets", which are now discontinued, and have been re-released as "series" 1 to 16 in redesigned packages.

In January 2006, Midsomer Murders started a DVD and Magazine Collection, available at newsagents in Australia, New Zealand, South Africa, and the UK.

Acorn Media UK has released 24 DVD sets of Midsomer Murders in North America as well as several collections, which are:
 The Early Cases 10 disc collection of 18 episodes includes the pilot episode and those of series one, two, three, and four (except the last episode), as well as a bonus disc featuring a behind-the-scenes documentary.
 Acorn's "Barnaby's Casebook" 10 disc collection has 17 episodes, including the last episode of series four, followed by those of series five, six, and seven.
 Acorn's "Village Case Files" 8 disc collection includes the 16 episodes of series eight, and nine; and a 4-minute bonus clip from series one.
 Acorn's "Mayhem & Mystery" 15 disc collection includes the 17 episodes of series ten and eleven.
 Acorn's "Tom Barnaby's Last Cases" 15 disc collection includes the 17 episodes of series twelve and thirteen.

Below table are the release dates for complete series sets in both Australia Region 4 and United Kingdom Region 2.

Books

References

External links

 
1997 British television series debuts
1990s British crime drama television series
1990s British mystery television series
2000s British crime drama television series
2000s British mystery television series
2010s British crime drama television series
2010s British mystery television series
2020s British crime drama television series
2020s British mystery television series
British detective television series
English-language television shows
ITV crime dramas
Race-related controversies in television
Television series by All3Media
Television series produced at Pinewood Studios
Television shows based on British novels
Television shows set in England
Television shows written by Anthony Horowitz
Fictional populated places in England